Visok (Cyrillic: Висок) is a region in eastern Serbia and westernmost Bulgaria that lies between the main ranges of the Balkan Mountains and Vidlič Mountain.

Geography 

The Visok region is characterized by steep valleys with mostly short rivers. It is of tectonic origin, but it was through intensive erosion, mostly fluvial erosion, that it was shaped.

The drainage network of this region is well developed. The Visočica River, with its tributaries, forms the densest drainage network in Serbia. Another very important hydrological feature of Visok is Lake Zavoj.

Climate 

The southwestern slopes of the Old Mountain are characterized by a moderate/continental sub-mountain/mountain climate, which gets colder and more humid from lower to higher elevations. The coldest month is January, and the warmest is July.

Population 

The region is depopulating and sparsely populated. The massive seasonal leave in search for work (pečalba) has been recorded from the late 18th century. The seasonal workers mostly worked in the construction business. In the second half of the 19th century the workers mostly left for Romania, Ottoman Empire and the Zagore region in Bulgaria. In Romania and Bulgaria they mostly worked in the villages, building houses made of čerpić (non-baked, Sun dried brick made of mud and straw), in the naboj style (compacted earth). They were spreading building influence so much, that the village architecture in the regions of Zagore and Visok is almost identical. From the late 19th century to the Balkan Wars, economic emigration intensified and the conditions in the Visok were so bad that even women travelled as seasonal workers, waving cloth.

The agriculture is barely possible because of the harsh conditions, so famine developed occasionally. In 1909 there were even reports of the deaths caused by starvation. In the late 19th and early 20th century, workers travelled mostly to Bulgaria, in groups of 10-15 people, called tajve. The working season was beginning around the Saint George's Day in early May, when the migrations would start, and was usually ending around Saint Demetrius Day in early November. After 1918 and World War I, as travelling in the foreign countries became problematic, population mostly migrated to Belgrade and the Serbian central region of Šumadija, but stayed mainly in the construction business.

Settlements 

The villages were divided in three groups, and not all has migrations of the seasonal workers. The groups were: "(very) hungry", "semi-fed" and "full fed" villages. First group (Dojkinci, Brlog, Jelovica, Šugrin, Cerova) gave the largest number of workers, then came the second group (Ragodeš, Bazovik), while the inhabitants of the villages from the third group, like Gostuša and Topli Do could sustain its population with the agricultural products so there was no need for people to leave during the year.

According to the urban-morphological structures, the villages in the region belong to the compacted type. The architecture in them mostly originates from the 19th and the first half of the 20th century and the older objects especially were influenced by the Oriental style and the Bulgarian old urban architecture. The houses are built from the natural, available materials, like wood or stone. The study made by the architects and conservators on protecting and preserving the village of Gostuša was awarded by the European Commission in 2016.

The typical household was enclosed with the stone wall (duvar). In the yard there were the central room (iža), bridal room, barn, grain basket, henhouses, pigsties, etc. Central room had a hearth and could be seated by up to 12 people. For such a desolate and arid region, the village houses show major diversity: some are plain but the others have façade level porches, protruded porches, arches, upper floors, balconies, verandas (doksat), foundations shaped like a Cyrillic "Г" letter, passages, bay windows (erkeri), etc. Larger estates included shepherd's huts (bačija), haylofts, etc. But as the region is depopulating fast, the objects deteriorate. In 2018 Serbian Academy of Sciences and Arts organized an exhibition on the subject. The most distinctive specimen include: House of Mila Cenkov (Smilovci; built in 1912, demolished in 2017); House of Mita Angelov (Visočki Odorovci; built in the early 1900s); House of Mira Mitić (Topli Do; built in 1933).

In July 2016, a summer school, or weaving colony, was founded in the village of Dojkinci. The goal was to teach students to weave Pirot carpet, as the trade had been dying out. The colony became an annual event.

References 

Geography of Southern and Eastern Serbia
Pirot District
Geographical regions of Bulgaria
Geographical regions of Serbia
Valleys of Bulgaria